Racter is an artificial intelligence computer program that generates English language prose at random. It was published in 1984 by Mindscape.

History

Racter, short for raconteur, was written by William Chamberlain and Thomas Etter. The existence of the program was revealed in 1983 in a book called The Policeman's Beard Is Half Constructed, which was described as being composed entirely by the program. The program originally was written for an OSI which only supported file names at most six characters long, causing the name to be shorted to Racter and it was later adapted to run on a CP/M machine where it was written in "compiled BASIC on a Z80 micro with 64K of RAM."  This version, the program that allegedly wrote the book, was not released to the general public. The sophistication claimed for the program was likely exaggerated, as could be seen by investigation of the template system of text generation.

However, in 1984 Mindscape released an interactive version of Racter, developed by Inrac Corporation, for IBM PC compatibles, Amiga, and Apple II computers. The published Racter was similar to a chatterbot. The BASIC program that was released by Mindscape was far less sophisticated than anything that could have written the fairly sophisticated prose of The Policeman's Beard. The commercial version of Racter could be likened to a computerized version of Mad Libs, the game in which you fill in the blanks in advance and then plug them into a text template to produce a surrealistic tale. The commercial program attempted to parse text inputs, identifying significant nouns and verbs, which it would then regurgitate to create "conversations", plugging the input from the user into phrase templates which it then combined, along with modules that conjugated English verbs.

By contrast, the text in The Policeman's Beard, apart from being edited from a large amount of output, would have been the product of Chamberlain's own specialized templates and modules, which were not included in the commercial release of the program.

Reception
PC Magazine described some of Policeman's Beards scenes as "surprising for their frankness" and "reflective". It concluded that the book was "whimsical and wise and sometimes fun". Computer Gaming World described Racter as "a diversion into another dimension that might best be seen before paying the price of a ticket. (Try before you buy!)"

A 1985 review of the program in The New York Times notes that, "As computers move ever closer to artificial intelligence, Racter is on the edge of artificial insanity." It also states that Racter's "always-changing sentences are grammatically correct, often funny and, for a computer, sometimes profound."  The article includes examples showing interaction with Racter, most often Racter asking the user questions.

See also 
 David Cope
 ELIZA
 MegaHAL

References

External links 

 The Policeman's Beard Is Half Constructed (PDF HTML)
 Racter download for MS-DOS based computers, including original template files.
 Getting a Computer to Write About Itself by Bill Chamberlain
 Racter FAQ from August 1993 issue of The Journal of Computer Game Design

Novelty software
Chatbots
Random text generation
Natural language generation